Shut It Down is the first studio album by the American death metal band Animosity released in 2003.

Track listing

Personnel 
Animosity

 Leo Miller – vocals
 Frank Costa – guitar
 Sean Kopperweis – guitar
 Nick Lazaro – bass
 Navene Kopperweis – drums
Production
 Zach Ohren – recording, engineering
 Matthew Rudzinski – production
 Jacob Bigham – artwork & design

References

2003 debut albums
Animosity (band) albums